Embalming chemicals are a variety of preservatives, sanitising and disinfectant agents, and additives used in modern embalming to temporarily prevent decomposition and restore a natural appearance for viewing a body after death. A mixture of these chemicals is known as embalming fluid and is used to preserve bodies of deceased persons for both funeral purposes and in medical research in anatomical laboratories. The period for which a body is embalmed is dependent on time, expertise of the embalmer and factors regarding duration of stay and purpose.

Typically, embalming fluid contains a mixture of formaldehyde, glutaraldehyde, methanol, and other solvents. The formaldehyde content generally ranges from 5 to 37 percent and the methanol content may range from 9 to 56 percent.

In the United States alone, about 20 million liters (roughly 5.3 million gallons) of embalming fluid are used every year.

How they work 

Embalming fluid acts to fix (denature) cellular proteins, meaning that they cannot act as a nutrient source for bacteria; embalming fluid also kills the bacteria themselves. Formaldehyde or glutaraldehyde fixes tissue or cells by irreversibly connecting a primary amine group in a protein molecule with a nearby nitrogen in a protein or DNA molecule through a -CH2- linkage called a Schiff base. The end result also creates the simulation, via color changes, of the appearance of blood flowing under the skin.

Modern embalming is not done with a single fixative. Instead, various chemicals are used to create a mixture, called an arterial solution, which is uniquely generated for the needs of each case. For example, a body needing to be repatriated overseas needs a higher index (percentage of diluted preservative chemical) than one simply for viewing (known in the United States and Canada as a funeral visitation) at a funeral home before cremation or burial.

Process

Embalming fluid is injected into the arterial system of the deceased's abdomen and a trocar is inserted into the body cavity. The organs in the chest cavity and the abdomen are then punctured and drained of gas and fluid contents.. Many other bodily fluids may also be displaced and removed from the body using the arterial system and in the case of cavity treatment aspirated from the body and replaced with a specialty fluid known as cavity fluid.

Chemicals and additives
It is important to distinguish between an arterial chemical (or fluid), which is generally taken to be the product in its original composition, and an arterial solution, which is a diluted mixture of chemicals and made to order for each body. Non-preservative chemicals in an arterial solution are generally called "accessory chemicals" or co/pre-injectants, depending on their time of utilization.

Potential ingredients in an arterial solution include:
 Preservative (Arterial) Chemical. These are commonly a percentage (normally 18–37%) based mixture of formaldehyde, glutaraldehyde or in some cases phenol which are then diluted to gain the final index of the arterial solution. Methanol is used to hold the formaldehyde in solution. Formalin refers specifically to 37% aqueous formaldehyde and is not commonly used in funeral embalming but rather in the preservation of anatomical specimens.
 Water Conditioner. These are designed to balance the "hardness" of water (the presence of other trace chemicals that change the water's pH or neutrality) and to help reduce the deceased's acidity, a by-product of decomposition, as formaldehyde works best in an alkaline environment.  Additionally, water conditioners may be used to help inactivate chemotherapy drugs and antibiotics, which may bind to and render ineffectual the preservative chemical.
 Cell Conditioner. These chemicals act to prepare cells for absorption of arterial fluid and help break up clots in the bloodstream.
 Dyes. Active dyes are used to restore the body's natural colouration and counterstain against conditions such as jaundice as well as to indicate distribution of arterial fluid.  Inactive dyes are used by the manufacturer of the arterial fluid to give a pleasant color to the fluid in the bottle but do nothing for the appearance of the embalmed body.
 Humectants. These are added to dehydrated and emaciated bodies to help restore tissue to a more natural and hydrated appearance.
 Anti-Edemic Chemicals. The opposite of humectants, these are designed to draw excessive fluid (edema) from a body.
 Additional Disinfectants. For certain cases, such as tissue gas, speciality chemicals such as Omega Decomp Factor, Triton-28, STOP or Dispray (Topical) can be arterially injected to kill tissue gas.
 Water. Most arterial solutions are a mix of some of the preceding chemicals with tepid water. Cases done without the addition of water are referred to as "waterless." Waterless embalming is more common in difficult cases or those requiring a very high degree of preservation, such as instances of an extended delay between death and final disposition.  
 Cavity Fluid. This is a generally a very high-index formaldehyde or glutaraldehyde solution injected undiluted directly via the trocar incision into the body cavities to treat the viscera. In cases of tissue gas, phenol based products are often used instead.

History
Prior to the advent of the modern range of embalming chemicals a variety of alternative additives have been used by embalmers, including epsom salts for edema cases, but these are of limited effectiveness and can be chalked up as "embalmer tricks", as the validity of their use  has never been demonstrated by professional embalmers or mortuary science programs.

During the American Civil War, the Union Army, wanting to transport slain soldiers from the battlefields back home for burial, consulted with Dr. Thomas Holmes, who developed a technique that involved draining a corpse's blood and embalming it with a fluid made with arsenic for preservation.

Embalming chemicals are generally produced by specialist manufacturers. The oldest embalming fluid company was founded as the Hill Fluid Company, in 1878, and was then incorporated by Dr. A.A. Bakker, as the Champion Company, in 1880, making The Champion Company 143 years old. Champion was still owned and operated by the Bakker Family until the death of Dr. Bakker's granddaughter, in the late 1970's. Champion still operates today and is still family owned by the Giankopulous Family. They continuously operate today. They are  located in Springfield, OH. The Frigid Fluid Company was founded in 1892, followed by the Dodge Company in 1893, with other companies including Egyptian, now U.S. Chemical, as well as Kelco Supply Company (formerly L H Kellogg), Pierce Chemical Company (now owned by The Wilbert Company), Bondol Chemical Company, and Hydrol Chemical Company. There are many smaller and regional producers as well. Some funeral homes produce their own embalming fluids, although this practice has declined in recent decades as commercially available products have become of better quality and more readily available.

Following the EU Biocides Legislation some pressure was brought to reduce the use of formaldehyde. IARC Classes Formaldehyde as a Class 1 Carcinogen. There are alternatives to formaldehyde and phenol-based fluids, but these are technically not preservatives but rather sanitising agents and are not widely accepted. However, The Champion Company has always been aware of the safety of the embalmer and created and distributed lower exposure fluids with less HCHO and by the 1990s Champion was the first to create and distribute HCHO Free Fluids. Only The Champion and The Dodge Company sell those fluids.

Environmental effects

Despite genuine concerns, formaldehyde is a naturally occurring substance, of which human beings produce approximately 1.5 oz a day as a normal part of a healthy metabolism. Formaldehyde also occurs naturally in many fruits, such as bananas, apples, and carrots, and does not bioaccumulate in either plants or animals. 

Formaldehyde works to fixate the tissue of the deceased. This is the characteristic that also makes concentrated formaldehyde hazardous when not handled using appropriate personal protective equipment. The carbon atom in formaldehyde, CH2O, carries a slight positive charge due to the high electronegativity of the oxygen double bonded with the carbon. The electropositive carbon will react with a negatively charged molecule and other electron-rich species. As a result, the carbon in the formaldehyde molecule bonds with electron-rich nitrogen groups called amines found in plant and animal tissue. This leads to formaldehyde cross-linking, bonding proteins with other proteins and DNA, rendering them dysfunctional or no longer useful. This is the reason for usage of formaldehyde as a preservative, as it thus prevents cellular decay and renders the tissue unsuitable for use as a nutrient source for bacteria.

Formaldehyde is carcinogenic in humans and animals at excessive levels because the cross-linking can cause DNA to keep cells from halting the replication process. This unwarranted replication of cells can lead to cancer. Unicellular organisms found in the soil and groundwater are also quite sensitive to cross-linking, experiencing damage at a concentration of 0.3 mg to 22 mg per liter. Formaldehyde also affects aquatic invertebrates, with crustaceans being the most sensitive type. The range of concentration damaging them is 0.4 mg to 20 mg per liter. 

Formaldehyde released from the cremation of embalmed bodies enters the atmosphere and can remain suspended for up to 250 hours. It is readily soluble in water so it will bond with moisture in the atmosphere and rain down onto plants, animals, and water supplies below. As a result, formaldehyde content in precipitation can range from 110 μg to 1380 μg per liter. These concerns notwithstanding formaldehyde, as a ubiquitous chemical produced by living beings, is eminently biodegradable by both sunlight in air and bacteria in soil and water. 

The growth of the environment movement has caused some people to consider green burials where there are either no aldehyde-based chemicals used in the embalming process, or there is no embalming process at all.  Embalming fluid meeting specific criteria for such burials is commercially available, and although it is not as effective as aldehyde-based solutions, is approved by the Green Burial Association of America. Only the Champion Company has created and distribute their 4th generation of fluids called “Enigma”, created in the early 2000’s. All of Champion’s enigma products have been approved by the green Burial Council.

See also
 Glass House (British Columbia) – a building in British Columbia constructed with empty embalming fluid bottles

References

Further reading

 Abrams, J.L. Embalming. 2008.
 Frederick, L.G.; Strub, Clarence G. [1959] (1989). The Principles and Practice of Embalming, 5th ed., Dallas, TX: Professional Training Schools Inc & Robertine Frederick. .
 Mayer, Robert G. (2000). Embalming: History, Theory and Practice, 3rd ed., McGraw-Hill/Appleton & Lange. .

External links 
 Official Champion Company Website
 Official Kelco Supply Company Website
 Official Pierce Chemical Company Website
 Official Frigid Fluid Company Website
 Official Trinity Fluids, LLC website
 Official Dodge Company Website
 Official Aardbalm Company Website
 CGI Embalming using Aardbalm

Chemical substances
Death customs
Anatomical preservation